Shin oak is a common name for several oaks and may refer to:

Quercus grisea
Quercus havardii
Quercus mohriana